Sadeqabad (also Romanized as Şādeqābād; also known as Sadegh Abad and Sādiqābād) is a village in Faragheh Rural District, in the Central District of Abarkuh County, Yazd Province, Iran. At the 2006 census, its population was 235, in 65 families.

References 

Populated places in Abarkuh County